Dimitri (Dimitrios) Salachas (born June 7, 1939 in Athens, Greece) was the Apostolic Exarch of the Greek Byzantine Catholic Church.

Life
Salachas was born on June 7, 1939 in Athens, Greece and was ordained priest on February 9, 1964.

He is a well-known Greek scholar in Canon Law. He has done his doctoral research in Byzantine Ecclesiastical Laws and civil laws. He has taught Canon Law (both Latin and Oriental) in Pontifical Urbaniana University, Pontifical Gregorian University, Pontifical University of Saint Thomas Aquinas, Angelicum and Pontifical Oriental Institute in Rome.

He is consultor of the Congregation for the Oriental Churches and of the Pontifical Councils for the Interpretation of the Legislative Texts and for the Promotion of the Unity of Christians. As an expert in comparative Ecclesiastical Laws, Bishop Salachas is member of the Episcopal Conference of Greece. He is the member of the Joint International Commission for Theological Dialogue Between the Catholic Church and the Orthodox Church. He is the member of the International Society of Oriental Canon Law.

On 23 April 2008 was appointed Apostolic Exarch of the Greek Byzantine Catholic Church and titular bishop. He was ordained bishop on 24 May 2008. In 2008 he was appointed titular bishop of Carcabia, and on 14 May 2012 he was promoted to the titular see of Gratianopolis.

Works
Bishop Salachas is a contributor to the Italian commentary on CCEO Commento al Codice dei Canoni delle Chiese Orientali (2001), the English edition of which is A Guide to the Eastern Code: A Commentary on the Code of Canons of the Eastern Churches (Pontificio istituto orientale, 2002)
His other major works are:
L'iniziazione cristiana nei Codici orientale e latino (1992);
Istituzioni di diritto canonico delle Chiese cattoliche orientali (1993);
Il sacramento del matrimonio nel Nuovo Diritto canonico delle Chiese orientali(1994);
Il Diritto canonico delle Chiese orientali nel primo millenio (1997);
Teologia e disciplina dei sacramenti nei codici latino e orientale (1999)
La vita consacrata nel Codice dei canoni delle Chiese orientali (CCEO) (2006);
Chierici e ministero sacro nel codice latino e orientale : prospettive interecclesiali  (2004);
Questioni interecclesiali nel diritto matrimoniale canonico (2003);
Dialogo interreligioso e inculturazione del Vangelo nell'azione missionaria della Chiesa (2003);
Codificazione latina e orientale e canoni preliminary (2003);
Il magistero e l'evangelizzazione dei popoli nei Codici latino e orientale : studio teologico-giuridico comparativo (2001);
Costituzioni dei Santi Apostoli : per mano di Clemente (2001);
Ta mysteria tes christianikes myeseos (Baptisma, Christma, Theia Eucharistia) : sto neo kodika kanonikou dikaiou tes Romaiokatholikes Ekklesias (Codex Iuris Canonici) (1989);
Il dialogo teologico ufficiale tra la chiesa cattolico-romana e la chiesa ortodossa : iter e documentazione (1994);
Il dialogo teologico ufficiale tra la chiesa cattolico-romana e la chiesa ortodossa : la quarta assemblea plenaria di Bari, 1986-1987 (1988).

See also 

Greek Byzantine Catholic Church
CCEO

References

External links 

 Pontifical Oriental Institute, Rome

Catholicism in Greece
Greek Eastern Catholic bishops
Canonical theologians
Living people
1939 births
Academic staff of the Pontifical Oriental Institute
Academic staff of the Pontifical Urban University
Academic staff of the Pontifical Gregorian University
Academic staff of the Pontifical University of Saint Thomas Aquinas
Greek scholars
Members of the Congregation for the Oriental Churches
Clergy from Athens